Kristina Vähi (2008-2014 Vähi-Matesen; born on 25 March 1973 in Tartu) is an Estonian opera singer (soprano) 

In 1996 she graduated from Georg Ots Tallinn Music School. In 2003 she graduated from Estonian Academy of Music and Theatre.

From 2006-2014, she was an operatic soloist at Estonia Theatre., and between 1997-2007, she was a member of operatic group Operetta Scretta.

Since 2005, Vähi works as a vocalist in the accompaniment class of the Tallinn Music High School and since 2018, also as a singing teacher and vocal coach.

Awards:
 1996: 1st prize in Klaudia Taev Competition

Roles

 Ernestine (Offenbach "Pitzelbergide salong", 1996, Estonian Music Academy)
 Danubia (Suppé "Kümme neidu ja ei ühtegi meest", 1998, Estonian Music Academy)
 Nicole and Etienne (Herman "Linnupuur", 1999, Smithbridge Productions)

References

Living people
1973 births
21st-century Estonian women opera singers
Estonian operatic sopranos
Tallinn Georg Ots Music School alumni
Estonian Academy of Music and Theatre alumni
Musicians from Tartu